is a Japanese manga series written and illustrated by Tooru Fujisawa. It is a sequel to the main Great Teacher Onizuka manga series. It has been published in Kodansha's Weekly Young Magazine since April 2014, with its chapters collected into nineteen tankōbon volumes as of July 2022.

Publication
Written and illustrated by Tooru Fujisawa, GTO: Paradise Lost is a sequel to the main Great Teacher Onizuka manga series. The manga began in Kodansha's seinen manga magazine Weekly Young Magazine on April 14, 2014. The manga went on hiatus in June 2015 and resumed publication in December of the same year. The series first part finished in October 2017, and went on hiatus due to a staff shortage; it resumed publication on May 27, 2019. In June 2021, Fujisawa stated that GTO: Paradise Lost would be the last manga in the GTO series. Kodansha has collected its chapters into individual tankōbon volumes. The first volume was published on August 6, 2014. As of July 6, 2022, nineteen volumes have been published.

Crunchyroll published the manga digitally in English language. In April 2017, Kodansha USA announced the digital release of the manga.

Volume list

References

External links
 

Great Teacher Onizuka
Kodansha manga
Seinen manga
Sequel comics